Peter Jacques (born 29 March 1973) is an English professional darts player who competes in events of the Professional Darts Corporation (PDC).

Career

Works at Royal Mail. Jacques attempted to win a PDC Tour Card in 2017, but after putting himself in a good position after three days, he did not appear for the fourth day, and subsequently did not receive a card.

He made the final of the first Players Championship event of 2017 in Barnsley, but lost 1–6 in the final to Alan Norris.

In May 2017, Jacques won a PDC Challenge Tour event, defeating Wayne Jones 5–4 in the final. He would win another Challenge Tour event in September, again defeating Jones, this time 5–2.

He acquired the nickname "The Terrier" late in 2017, sharing the nickname of the football team he supports, Huddersfield Town.

in 2022 Peter Jacques has took part in the Modus Super Series, Winning one of the events (Week 11) beating Robert Thornton & Martin Adams along the way. He will take part in the finals week on 17th October.

World Championship results

PDC

 2018: First round (lost to Kyle Anderson 1–3)

References

External links

1973 births
Living people
English darts players
Sportspeople from Huddersfield
Professional Darts Corporation former tour card holders